is a series of ten Japanese action comedy films produced by Toei and released from 1975 to 1979. All ten films in the series were directed by Norifumi Suzuki and starred Bunta Sugawara as Momojiro Hoshi ("Ichibanboshi" or "first star") and Kinya Aikawa as Kinzo Matsushita, also known as "Jonathan". The title Torakku Yaro means "truck guys" or "truck rascals", and the films involve two truckers and their various escapades as they travel around Japan in highly decorated trucks.

The plot formula is similar to the Otoko wa Tsurai yo films. Each time Momojiro falls in love with a woman (the "Madonna") and then ends up having to help her romance with another man. The stories end with Momojiro having to race his truck to meet a deadline to rejoin the couple.

Regulars

Momojiro Hoshi, nicknamed "Ichibanboshi", played by Bunta Sugawara.

Kinzo Matsushita, nicknamed "Yamome no Jonathan", played by Kinya Aikawa.

Kimie Matsushita, the wife of Kinzo Matsushita, played by Masumi Harukawa

Films

Theme music

All the films have the same theme song, Ichibanboshi Blues by Ryudo Uzaki and Yoko Aki performed by the Down Town Boogie Woogie Band.

References 

  

Japanese film series
Trucker films
1970s Japanese films